Leander Campbell House, also known as the Judge Brill House, is a historic home located at Danville, Hendricks County, Indiana.  It was built in 1858 as a simple -story brick I-house.  It was extensively remodeled and updated in the Queen Anne style about 1885.  It has a slate hipped roof and features a centrally placed three-story tower on the front facade.  Also on the property are the contributing summer kitchen and brick garage.

It was added to the National Register of Historic Places in 2003.

References

Houses on the National Register of Historic Places in Indiana
Queen Anne architecture in Indiana
Houses completed in 1858
National Register of Historic Places in Hendricks County, Indiana
Buildings and structures in Hendricks County, Indiana